The Millennium Summit was a meeting among several world leaders that took place from September 6–8, 2000 at the United Nations headquarters in New York City in order to discuss the role of the United Nations in the turn of the 21st century. Over 150 heads of state, heads of government, crown princes, vice presidents, deputy prime ministers, and other delegates attended, making this summit the largest gathering of world leaders as of the year 2000.

The Millennium Summit was hosted by the United States and jointly presided over by President of Finland Tarja Halonen and President of Namibia Sam Nujoma.

Delegations

Co-chairs as Finland and Namibia
The President of Finland Tarja Halonen and the President of Namibia Sam Nujoma co-chaired the Millennium Summit. This was due to the Presidency over the General Assembly of Theo-Ben Gurirab in the fifty-fourth session and that of Harri Holkeri in the fifty-fifth session. Therefore, the Heads of state of Finland and Namibia were chosen to preside over the summit.

Delegation of the Democratic People's Republic of Korea
Kim Yong Nam, Head of state of the Democratic People's Republic of Korea, cancelled his visit to the Millennium Summit after an incident at an airport in Frankfurt, Germany. He and his fellow diplomats were subjected to inspection by American Airlines officials. The diplomats claimed diplomatic immunity, which can free them from any law enforcement while visiting other countries.

Delegation of Tuvalu
Tuvalu was admitted to the United Nations the day before the Millennium Summit began, on September 5, 2000. This country was accepted as the 189th member of the United Nations, signifying Tuvalu's major development since its independence in 1978.

See also
 List of foreign ministers in 2000
 List of state leaders in 2000
 Millennium Summit
 United Nations member states

References

United Nations officials
United Nations-related lists
Turn of the third millennium